Munhango is a city in the province of Bié in Angola.

References 

Populated places in Bié Province
Municipalities of Angola